Santa Maria Capua Vetere is a town and comune in the province of Caserta, part of the region of Campania (southern Italy).

Though it is not connected with the Civitas Capuana, the town is a medieval place and its proximity to the Roman amphitheatre led the inhabitants to change its name in Santa Maria Capua Vetere, where Capua Vetere means Old Capua.

History

In the area several settlements of the Villanovan culture were present in pre-historical times, and these were probably enlarged by the Oscans and Etruscans. In the 4th century BCE Capuae was the largest city in Italy after Rome.

The city was damaged by Vandal ravages but later recovered and became the seat of an independent Lombard principate. However, during the struggle of the succession to the Duchy of Benevento, it was destroyed by a band of Saracens in 841 CE. The survivors mostly fled and founded the modern Capua in the site of the ancient River port of Casilinum.

What is now Santa Maria Capua Vetere started to grow slowly when several countryside residences appeared around the old Christian basilicas of Santa Maria Maggiore, San Pietro in Corpo and Sant'Erasmo in Capitolio. King Robert of Anjou made Santa Maria Maggiore one of his summer residences.

The town was known as Santa Maria Maggiore until 1861.

Main sights

For information about main ancient landmarks in the comune of Santa Maria Capua Vetere, see Main sights in Capua.

The main other landmark of Santa Maria Capua Vetere is the Basilica of Santa Maria Maggiore, founded, according to the tradition, by Pope Symmachus in the 5th century. The church had originally a single nave, but was enlarged by Lombard Prince Arechis II of Benevento in 787. Another renovation was carried out in 1666 by Cardinal Robert Bellarmine, with the addition of two further aisles; the current Late Baroque appearance dates to the 1742–88 works, during which the precious mosaic area of the apse was destroyed.

People
 Marcello Trotta, footballer, was born here.

 Pina Picierno is a member and Vice President of the European Parliament. 

 Errico Malatesta was an Italian anarchist, social and political activist, writer and revolutionary.
 Frank Matano, Italian actor, presenter and voice actor.

Twin towns
  Murcia, Spain

See also
Seconda Università degli Studi di Napoli
 Bishopric of Capua

References

External links

 

 
Populated places established in the 12th century
Capua
Villanovan culture